Maldon Sea Salt is a salt-producing company in Maldon on the high-salinity banks of the River Blackwater in Essex, England. The river is favoured by flat tide-washed salt marshes and low rainfall.

History 
Sea salt production in the coastal town of Maldon dates back to the time of Roman Britain when clay-lined salt evaporation ponds were constructed, and according to the Domesday Book, 45 lead pans were used to manufacture salt there in 1086.

The Maldon Salt Company was founded under its current name in 1882, having previously been part of a local coal firm. In the 1990s and early 2000s, Maldon's salt grew in popularity after being used by prominent chefs including Ruth Rogers, Delia Smith, and Jamie Oliver.

Salt 

Maldon Sea Salt is made by evaporating brine over fires mounted on an elaborate network of brick flues. The resulting pyramid-shaped crystals prevent the salt from caking, and it is used as a finishing salt.

The company claims that the salt's low magnesium content means it has less of a bitter aftertaste than other salts. Salt gained from evaporating sea water does, however, have a higher magnesium ion content that standard table salts.

References

External links
 

Companies based in Essex
Salt production
Food and drink companies of England
Maldon, Essex
1882 establishments in England